Latvian Football Cup 2010–11 is the sixty-ninth season of the Latvian annual football knock-out competition.  The winners will qualify for the second qualifying round of the UEFA Europa League 2011–12.

First round

Second round

Third round
Into this round entered the six winners of the previous round and nine clubs from the Latvian First League. Six of the clubs were drawn into three matches before the round began to reduce the number of clubs in this round to 12. These matches took place on 29 August and 9 September 2010.

The remaining 12 clubs were drawn together into six matches. These matches took place on 18 and 19 September 2010.

Round of 16
Entering this round were the six winners from the previous round and the ten clubs from the Latvian Higher League. The draw for this round occurred on 20 September 2010. These matches were played between 26 September 2010 and 20 October 2010.

|}

Quarterfinals
The eight winners from the previous round compete in this round. These matches were played between 19 March 2011 and 26 March 2011.

|}

Semifinals
The four winners from the previous round compete in this round. These matches were played 30 March 2011.

|}

Final

External links
 LFF.lv

2010-11
2010–11 domestic association football cups
Cup
Cup